Jacques Canthelou (29 March 1904 – 18 April 1973) was a French footballer. He played in eleven matches for the France national football team between 1924 and 1928.

References

External links
 

1904 births
1973 deaths
French footballers
France international footballers
People from Elbeuf
Sportspeople from Seine-Maritime
Association football defenders
FC Rouen players
Olympic footballers of France
Footballers at the 1924 Summer Olympics
Footballers at the 1928 Summer Olympics
Footballers from Normandy